John Thomas (1826–1908) was a Welsh mystic of the late 19th century. He used the professional name Charubel to practice, claiming to be a clairvoyant, occultist and healer.

Early years
As a young man John Thomas studied for the Christian ministry, but ultimately followed occult and psychic interests.

Writings
Adopting the pseudonym "Charubel", he published numerous books and was editor of several esoteric periodicals. He co-authored Degrees of the Zodiac Symbolised with the much younger mystic and astrologer Sepharial (Dr Walter Gorn Old).

He developed a set of occult symbols that he is known for; these were first published in Alan Leo's Astrologer's Magazine in 1893.

Welsh occultists
1826 births
1908 deaths
Clairvoyants